, also known as The Tale of Ochikubo, is a story from the Heian period which is similar to the famous fairy tale Cinderella.

Ochikubo Monogatari was written during the later part of the 10th century by an unknown author. It is known as the oldest surviving tale in Japanese literature to include harassment and bullying from a stepmother. Ochikubo Monogatari's well-formed plot and vivid description of characters influenced many writers such as Murasaki Shikibu, author of The Tale of Genji. The lively dialogues are also of particular quality.

Plot 
After suffering from relentless harassment from her stepmother, Princess Ochikubo meets a man named Michiyori who is a general. The two marry and Princess Ochikubo lives very happily with him. Michiyori starts to take revenge on Princess Ochikubo's family, setting up a series of humiliating events.

Characters

Chūnagon
Is a title for a noble who is Middle Rank and one of the three State Counsellors. His real name is unknown and is only known by his title Chūnagon. He is the father of Lady Ochikubo and is under control of Kita no Kata. He never treated Lady Ochikubo with affection and feels sorry at times towards his daughter for living through the loneliness and without care from family.

Kita no Kata
Her real name in the story is unknown, only known as according to her title as Kita no Kata. She is the step-mother of Lady Ochikubo and wife of the Chūnagon. She plays as the cruel step-mother who continuously gives trouble and humiliation to her step-daughter. She dislikes Lady Ochikubo and takes all the happiness and luxurious things away from her. Kita no Kata would not address her step-daughter as “princess” or “Lady”, and would rather address her as servant if she could. But due to her concern that the Lord may dislike her upon for calling Lady Ochikubo as servant, she tells everyone in the mansion to title the Lady as “Ochikubo no Kimi”

Lady Ochikubo
She is the daughter of Chūnagon and step-daughter of Kita no Kata. Her existence in the mansion is unknown to people and receives no care or affection from anyone other than her special attendant named Akogi, also known as Ushiromi. She falls in love later with Michiyori and escapes from the grasp and torture from her step-mother. She is kind hearted but yet a very humble and reserved character where she makes careful moves around the house for the fear that her step-mother will inflict on her even more suffering and humiliation than she already endured.

Akogi (Ushiromi)
She is a loyal servant of Lady Ochikubo and has the position as the special attendant in the mansion. She receives much love from the Lady and only wishes to serve under Lady Ochikubo. Akogi—originally named Ushiromi—has sympathy for and understands Lady Ochibuko the most in the mansion and seeks to find the ideal man for the Lady to marry to so she can escape from the loneliness in the house and also from the further cruelty received from Kita no Kata. Her name later got changed to Akogi by the step-mother's order because although the step-mother separated Lady Ochikubo and Akogi, she always sees Akogi's loyalty follow and belong only to the Lady. Also the name 'Ushiromi' means “guardian” hence it is symbolic that Akogi is the guardian angel for Lady Ochibuko. The step-mother dislikes this fact and thinks that it is not an appropriate name so she changes her name to Akogi.

Translations 
The story was translated into modern Japanese in 1993 by Saeko Himuro.

The story was first translated into English in 1934 by Wilfred Whitehouse; a revised edition credited to Whitehouse and Eizo Yanagisawa was published in 1970.

See also
 Sumiyoshi Monogatari, a similar Cinderella-like story dealing with stepmother bullying.

References

Late Old Japanese texts
Monogatari
Works of unknown authorship